Cape Kombies is a cape on the southwestern coast of New Guinea, near Yos Sudarso Island, in Papua Province, New Guinea.

History
During World War II, a radar station of the Australian Army was installed there, with the aim of spotting Japanese airplanes coming from the Aru islands or the Vogelkop to attack Merauke and the Torres Strait. The station operated from May 1943 until May 1945.

Notes

References

 

Kombies
Landforms of Papua (province)